Niki Goulandris (1925 – 9 February 2019) was a Greek philanthropist and an accomplished botanical painter.

Early life 
Goulandris helped illustrate several botanical books, such as Wild Flowers of Greece by C. Goulimis and W.T. Stearn, and Peonies of Greece by Stearn and P.H. Davies.

She was vice-president of the Goulandris Natural History Museum and Goulandris Museum of Cycladic Art, former deputy minister for Social Services (1974–75), former Secretary of State for health in Greece(1974), honorary deputy president of Hellenic Radio and Television (1975–80), and member of the World Commission on Culture and Development of UNESCO. She was winner of the United Nations Environmental Programme (UNEP) Global 500 Award in 1990, and in 1991 was named Woman of Europe by the European Commission, European Parliament, and European Movement.

Born Niki Kephala, she was married to Angelos Goulandris, of the wealthy ship-owning Goulandris family, with whom she established the Goulandris Natural History Museum in 1965.

After graduating from the German School of Athens, Niki Goulandris studied Political Science and Economics at the University of Athens and continued with post-graduate studies in Political Science and Philosophy at the University of Frankfurt under the philosophers Theodor W. Adorno and Max Horkheimer. She spoke French, German, and English fluently. She died on 9 February 2019 on her 94th birthday.

References

Bibliography

External links
 Biography on the EURAN (European Art Network) website)
 Botanical paintings by Niki Goulandris
 Niki Goulandris, una filantropa ambientalista ed artista.

1925 births
2019 deaths
National and Kapodistrian University of Athens alumni
Greek artists
Niki
Greek philanthropists
Members of the European Academy of Sciences and Arts
20th-century philanthropists